Vitaliy Ivanovych Hodulian (Ukrainian: Віталій Іванович Годулян, born 18 September 1968 in Odessa, Ukraine) is a former Ukrainian professional football referee. He has been a full international for FIFA since 2001.

References

External links
 
 
 Vitaliy Hodulyan referee profile at allplayers.in.ua

1968 births
Living people
Sportspeople from Odesa
Ukrainian football referees